Thai Nguyen National General Hospital (TCGH), established in 1951, was the first Northern mountainous and midland hospital in Vietnam. The hospital provides 800 beds

Notes

Hospital buildings completed in 1951
Hospitals established in 1951
Hospitals in Vietnam
Buildings and structures in Thái Nguyên province